John Beuth (born 27 June 1945) is a New Zealand cricketer. He played in twelve first-class matches for Northern Districts from 1962 to 1970.

See also
 List of Northern Districts representative cricketers

References

External links
 

1945 births
Living people
New Zealand cricketers
Northern Districts cricketers
Cricketers from Gisborne, New Zealand